225 Liberty Street, formerly Two World Financial Center, is one of four towers that comprise the Brookfield Place complex in the Financial District of Lower Manhattan in New York City. Though the building has a nominal address on Liberty Street, its most prominent facade is on West Street between Liberty and Vesey Streets. The building opened in 1987 as part of the World Financial Center and was designed by Haines Lundberg Waehler and Cesar Pelli & Associates.

The building is home to Dotdash Meredith, BNY Mellon, Hudson's Bay Company, Commerzbank, Fiserv, Oppenheimer Funds, Inc., State Street Corporation, McElroy, Deutsch, Virtusa, Mulvaney & Carpenter, LLP, Thacher Proffitt & Wood, LLP, and several divisions of France Telecom, among other companies. It connects to the rest of the World Financial Center complex through a courtyard leading to the Winter Garden, a dramatic glass-and-steel public space with a 120-foot vaulted ceiling under which there is an assortment of trees and plants, including sixteen 12-meter palm trees from the Mojave Desert.

The building was renamed from Two World Financial Center when the rest of the complex was renamed Brookfield Place in 2014.

225 Liberty Street and its neighbors had been severely damaged by the falling debris when the World Trade Center towers collapsed due to the September 11 attacks. The building had to be closed for repairs until May 2002 as a result of damage sustained in the terrorist attacks.

See also

 World Trade Center
 Brookfield Place (New York City)
 List of tallest buildings in New York City

References

External links

1987 establishments in New York City
Office buildings completed in 1987
Skyscraper office buildings in Manhattan
Brookfield Place (New York City)
Brookfield Properties buildings
Battery Park City
West Side Highway